Highvale is a locality in Alberta, Canada.

The community's name was inspired by Highgate, Ontario, the native home of an early postmaster.

References 

Localities in Parkland County